is a water polo player from Japan. He was part of the Japanese team at the 2016 Summer Olympics, where the team was eliminated in the group stage.

See also
 Japan men's Olympic water polo team records and statistics
 List of men's Olympic water polo tournament goalkeepers

References

External links
 

1993 births
Living people
Japanese male water polo players
Water polo goalkeepers
Olympic water polo players of Japan
Water polo players at the 2016 Summer Olympics
Asian Games silver medalists for Japan
Asian Games medalists in water polo
Water polo players at the 2014 Asian Games
Water polo players at the 2018 Asian Games
Medalists at the 2014 Asian Games
Medalists at the 2018 Asian Games
Water polo players at the 2020 Summer Olympics
21st-century Japanese people